Montirictus is an extinct genus of tritylodonts known from the Early Cretaceous Kuwajima Formation of Japan. It was the latest surviving tritylodontid species until Fossiomanus was described, and is closely related to the earlier Xenocretosuchus from mainland Asia, and the Jurassic Stereognathus from the UK. It may be a species of the genus Stereognathus, but resolution of its affinities conditions upon the discovery of additional material.

References

Prehistoric cynodont genera
Fossil taxa described in 2016
Extinct animals of Japan
Early Cretaceous synapsids
Tritylodontids
Fossils of Japan